There have been four baronetcies created for persons with the surname Andrews, two in the Baronetage of England, one in the Baronetage of Great Britain and one in the Baronetage of the United Kingdom. All four creations are extinct.

The Andrews Baronetcy, of Doddington in the County of Northampton, was created in the Baronetage of England on 11 December 1641 for William Andrews. The title became extinct on the death of the fifth Baronet in 1804.

The Andrews Baronetcy, of Lathbury in the County of Buckingham, was created in the Baronetage of England on 27 May 1661 for Harry Andrews. The title became extinct on his death in 1696.

The Andrews Baronetcy, of Shaw Place in the County of Berkshire, was created in the Baronetage of Great Britain on 19 August 1766 for Joseph Andrews. The title became extinct on the death of the second Baronet in 1822.

The Andrews Baronetcy, of Comber in the County of Down, was created in the Baronetage of the United Kingdom on 6 July 1942 for James Andrews, Lord Chief Justice of Northern Ireland. He was the brother of J. M. Andrews, Prime Minister of Northern Ireland, and Thomas Andrews, shipbuilder. The title became extinct on Andrews' death in 1951.

Andrews baronets, of Doddington (1641) 

Sir William Andrews, 1st Baronet (died )
Sir John Andrews, 2nd Baronet (died )
Sir William Andrews, 3rd Baronet (died 1684)
Sir Francis Andrews, 4th Baronet (died 1759)
Sir Williams Andrews, 5th Baronet (died 1804)

Andrews baronets, of Lathbury (1661)

Sir Harry Andrews, 1st Baronet (c. 1629–1696)

Andrews baronets, of Shaw Place (1766)

Sir Joseph Andrews, 1st Baronet (1727–1800)
Sir Joseph Andrews, 2nd Baronet (1768–1822)

Andrews baronets, of Comber (1942)
 Sir James Andrews, 1st Baronet (1877–1951)

References
 

Extinct baronetcies in the Baronetage of England
Extinct baronetcies in the Baronetage of Great Britain
Extinct baronetcies in the Baronetage of the United Kingdom